Sorano is a town and comune in the province of Grosseto, southern Tuscany (Italy).

It as an ancient medieval hill town hanging from a tuff stone over the Lente River.

History

Sorano was probably inhabited by Villanovan culture, but the first historical mentions are relative to the 3rd century BC, when it was an Etruscan city under the influence of the more populous nearby Sovana.

Disappearing from history under the Roman domination, it is again known in 862 when a county was founded by Emperor Louis II, under the Aldobrandeschi suzerainty. The Aldobrandeschi were the most powerful feudataries of southern Tuscany for more than four centuries, disappearing in 1312 when Margherita, son of Ildibrandino, died without male heirs. His daughter Adelaide married to Romano di Gentile Orsini, who added the city to the family fiefs.

The county of Pitigliano-Sorano fought against the Republic of Siena, but was forced to accept its suzerainty from 1417. It regained a full independence in 1556, when the latter was annexed to the Duchy of Tuscany. The fortress, due to its strategic position, was frequently attacked; it was also the seat of fratricidal fights between the Orsini. In 1604, with the death of Alessandro di Bertoldo, it became part of the Grand Duchy of Tuscany.

It became part of the Kingdom of Italy in 1860.

Frazioni 
The municipality is formed by the municipal seat of Sorano and the villages (frazioni) of Castell'Ottieri, Cerreto, Elmo, Montebuono, Montevitozzo, Montorio, San Giovanni delle Contee, San Quirico, San Valentino and Sovana.

Culture
Comedian Jack Benny mentions Sorano in a running gag on both the radio and television versions of The Jack Benny Program, in which Jack has written a song entitled “When You Say 'I Beg Your Pardon,' Then I’ll Come Back to You.” In the gag, each time Jack reaches the lyric “when the swallows at Sorano return to Capistrano,” the song is interrupted by a cast member or guest star questioning how a swallow could possibly fly all the way from Italy to California.

Main sights
Rocca degli Orsini (Orsini castle), built in the 14th century but totally renovated by Niccolò IV Orsini in 1552. It is considered one of the most important examples of Renaissance military architecture. It has two massive angular bastions, connected by a line of walls with the main gate, which is surmounted by a noteworthy coat of arms and by a square tower. In the interior of the walls are remains of the ancient nucleus, with a round tower and the draw-bridge, now disappeared. A cycle of 16th-century frescoes of Sienese school have been recently found out.
Masso Leopoldino, a natural tuff stone carved to form a fortified, panoramic terrace by order of Gran Duke Leopold.
 Vitozza cave settlement and fortress

Another castle is in the frazione of Sovana.

See also
Pitigliano
Sovana

References

External links

Official website

 
Villanovan culture

zh:索拉诺